This is a list of events in Scottish television from 2005.

Events
5–6 May – BBC Parliament broadcasts BBC Scotland's 2005 general election results programme.
18 September – The STV sports programme Scotsport celebrates 50 years on air.

Debuts

BBC
December – VideoGaiden on BBC Two (2005–2008)
Unknown – The Adventure Show on BBC Two (2005–present)

ITV
Unknown – The Scottish Golf Show (2005)

Television series
Scotsport (1957–2008)
Reporting Scotland (1968–1983; 1984–present)
Scotland Today (1972–2009)
Sportscene (1975–present)
The Beechgrove Garden (1978–present)
Grampian Today (1980–2009)
Taggart (1983–2010)
Only an Excuse? (1993–2020)
Still Game (2002–2007; 2016–2019)
River City (2002–present)
The Karen Dunbar Show (2003–2006)
Politics Now (2004–2011)

Ending this year
23 October – Monarch of the Glen (2000–2005)
27 November – Shoebox Zoo on BBC One (2004–2005)
Balamory (2002–2005)

Deaths
9 March – Kathie Kay, 86, singer
14 May - George Barron, 91, original presenter of The Beechgrove Garden (1978-84)
31 August – Michael Sheard, 77, actor

See also
2005 in Scotland

References

 
Television in Scotland by year
2000s in Scottish television